AJJ may refer to:
AJJ (band), an American folk punk band, formerly Andrew Jackson Jihad
AJJ (Association des Jeunes Juifs), French Jewish youth organisation founded 1912 by writer André Spire
AJJ Akjoujt Airport, Mauritania (by IATA airport code)